Rory Ogle (1954 – 2013) was an American politician who served as a member of the New Mexico House of Representatives from 2003 to 2005. A member of the Republican Party, Ogle represented the 28th district.

Early life and education 
Ogle was born in 1954, the son of John D. Ogle, a member of the United States Armed Forces. He graduated from Heidelberg High School in Heidelberg, Germany. He attended The Citadel and graduated from the University of Northern Colorado. He then served as a captain in the United States Army. Ogle was also an Eagle Scout.

Career 
After leaving the Army, Ogle worked as a defense contractor and analyst for the Science Applications International Corporation in Virginia.

Ogle was elected to the New Mexico House of Representatives in 2002 and served for one term. During his tenure, Ogle was arrested on charges of domestic violence and aggravated battery against his wife, Anita. After his arrest, Ogle resigned from office and was succeeded by Jimmie Hall.

Death 
Ogle died of pneumonia in February 9, 2013 at the age of 58.

References 

1955 births
2013 deaths
University of Northern Colorado alumni
The Citadel, The Military College of South Carolina alumni
Republican Party members of the New Mexico House of Representatives
People from Albuquerque, New Mexico
21st-century American politicians